Falou Samb (born 17 January 1997) is a Senegalese professional footballer who plays as a forward.

Career
Samb made his Serie C debut for Mantova on 6 February 2016 in a game against Cremonese.

On 30 July 2018, he moved from Italy to Malta, signing a two-year contract with Mosta. He left the club to join Italian club Avezzano Calcio on 11 January 2019. After only four months, Samb's contract was terminated by mutual consent.

In the summer 2019, Samb joined French club Blois.

References

External links
 
 

1997 births
Footballers from Dakar
Living people
Senegalese footballers
Association football forwards
Genoa C.F.C. players
Mantova 1911 players
A.C. Ancona players
Ravenna F.C. players
Reggina 1914 players
Mosta F.C. players
Avezzano Calcio players
Blois Football 41 players
CS Sedan Ardennes players
Al-Kawkab FC players
Serie C players
Serie D players
Maltese Premier League players
Championnat National 2 players
Saudi First Division League players
Senegalese expatriate footballers
Expatriate footballers in Italy
Expatriate footballers in Malta
Expatriate footballers in France
Ivorian expatriate sportspeople in Saudi Arabia
Senegalese expatriate sportspeople in Italy
Senegalese expatriate sportspeople in France
Senegalese expatriate sportspeople in Saudi Arabia
Senegalese expatriate sportspeople in Malta